Ravishankar, Ravisankar, or Ravishanker may refer to

People
 Ravi Shankar, Hindustani classical composer, musician
 Ravi Shankar (spiritual leader) Indian Spiritual Leader
 Ravisankar, Indian playback singer
 Ravishankar Gowda, Indian actor who works in the Kannada film industry
 Ravishankar Puvendran  Canadian Cricketer
 Ravishankar Raval, Indian painter, art critic and journalist
 Ravishankar Shukla, Indian National Congress Leader
 Ravi Shastri, born Ravishankar Jayadritha Shastri, Indian cricketer
 K. Ravisankar, Indian politician
 Nalini Ravishanker, Indian statistician
 Shanmuganathan Ravishankar, LTTE Head of Intelligence

Other uses
 Pandit Ravishankar Shukla Stadium, a cricket ground in Durg
 Pandit Ravishankar Shukla University, Chhattisgarh
 Ravishankar Shukla Stadium, sports venue in Jabalpur